Strobel or Ströbel is a surname. Notable people with the surname include:

 Allie Strobel (1884–1955), American baseball player
 Andreas Strobel (born 1972), German ski mountaineer and mountain biker
 Art Strobel (born 1922), Canadian hockey player
 Aron Strobel (born 1958), German musician
 Bartholomeus Strobel (1591–c. 1647), German-Polish Baroque painter
 Edward Henry Strobel, United States diplomat
 Elijess Strobel Lord of Fairview, deliverer of packages, consumer of bananas, inventor and master of "The Strobel Strut"
 Eric Strobel (born 1958), American ice hockey  player
 Gabriel Strobl (1846–1925), Austrian priest and entomologist 
 Gary Strobel (born 1938), American microbiologist
 Greg Strobel, American wrestling coach
 Heinrich Strobel (1898-1970), German musicologist
 Käte Strobel (1907–1996), German politician and minister
 Lee Strobel (born 1952), American author
 Mike Strobel (born 1955), Canadian journalist
 Pellegrino Strobel (1821–1895), Italian zoologist
 René Strobel (born 1954), Dutch Surgeon
 Scott Strobel Yale Professor
 Sebastian Ströbel (born 1977), German film and TV actor

Fictional characters:
 Mark Strobel, a Chris Farley character on Saturday Night Live

See also 
 1628 Strobel, a main-belt asteroid
 Strobl

German-language surnames